Giulești is a commune in Maramureș County, Maramureș, Romania. It is composed of four villages: Berbești (Bárdfalva), Ferești (Fejérfalva), Giulești and Mănăstirea (Gyulamonostor).

References

Communes in Maramureș County
Localities in Romanian Maramureș